Six sharps may refer to:
F-sharp major, a major musical key with six sharps
D-sharp minor, a minor musical key with six sharps